KDDX (101.1 FM, "X Rock") is a radio station licensed to serve Spearfish, South Dakota.  The station is owned by Riverfront Broadcasting, LLC. It airs an active rock music format. With a 100,000 watt signal on a nearly 1,800 foot tall tower, the station covers much of western South Dakota (including Rapid City), and the Gillette/Northeast Wyoming area.

The station was assigned the KDDX call letters by the Federal Communications Commission on April 28, 1995.

Translators

References

External links
KDDX official website

DDX
Active rock radio stations in the United States
Lawrence County, South Dakota